The 2006 Ukrainian Cup Final was a football match that took place at the Olympic NSC on 2 May 2006. The match was the 15th Ukrainian Cup final, and it was contested by Metalurh Zaporizhzhia and Dynamo Kyiv. The Olympic stadium is the traditional arena for the Cup final.

Road to Kyiv 

All 16 Ukrainian Premier League clubs do not have to go through qualification to get into the competition, so Dynamo and Metalurh Zaporizhzhia both qualified for the competition automatically.

Match details

Match statistics

See also
 Ukrainian Cup 2005-06
 Ukrainian Premier League 2005-06

References

External links 

Cup Final
Ukrainian Cup finals
Ukrainian Cup Final 2006
Ukrainian Cup Final 2006
Sports competitions in Kyiv